Orestis Nikolopoulos (born 26 August 1991) is a Greek professional footballer who plays as a centre-back for Maltese club Ħamrun Spartans.

References

1991 births
Living people
Greek expatriate footballers
Football League (Greece) players
Gamma Ethniki players
Cypriot Second Division players
Maltese Premier League players
Fostiras F.C. players
Egaleo F.C. players
Aittitos Spata F.C. players
A.O. Glyfada players
Vyzas F.C. players
Iraklis Psachna F.C. players
Aris Thessaloniki F.C. players
Olympiacos Volos F.C. players
Omonia Aradippou players
Kalamata F.C. players
A.E. Karaiskakis F.C. players
Ħamrun Spartans F.C. players
Association football defenders
Footballers from Athens
Greek footballers